Japan competed at the 1994 Winter Paralympics in Lillehammer, Norway. 26 competitors from Japan won 6 medals, 3 silver and 3 bronze, and finished 18th in the medal table.

See also 
 Japan at the Paralympics
 Japan at the 1994 Winter Olympics

References 

Japan at the Paralympics
1994 in Japanese sport
Nations at the 1994 Winter Paralympics